Andrew Fergus McCormick (アンドリュー・マコーミック; born 5 February 1967) is a New Zealand-born Japanese rugby union coach and former player.

The son of All Black Fergie McCormick, McCormick (nicknamed "Angus") was educated at Christchurch Boys' High School and came to Japan to play for Toshiba Fuchu in 1992. He was a powerful centre who had a large impact and played 25 times for the Japan national rugby union team, which he captained during the 1999 Rugby World Cup. A hugely popular player, he began coaching at Toshiba and then became a player (2002) and technical adviser (2004) at Kamaishi Seawaves.

On 23 March 2005, it was announced that McCormick would take up a post as backs coach at Coca-Cola West Japan on the invitation of head coach Shogo Mukai.

McCormick is currently Head Coach of Kwansei Gakuin University’s rugby club.

References

External links
Andrew F. McCormick at New Zealand Rugby History

1967 births
Living people
New Zealand rugby union players
Expatriate rugby union players in Japan
New Zealand rugby union coaches
Japan international rugby union players
New Zealand expatriate rugby union players
New Zealand expatriate sportspeople in Japan
Toshiba Brave Lupus Tokyo players
People educated at Christchurch Boys' High School
Rugby union centres